On Friday, April 16, 2016, a  forest fire was first reported in Shenandoah National Park in the U.S. state of Virginia. The fire originated in the area around Rocky Mount, a mountain in the south district of the park, in a remote region south of Elkton, Virginia. The fire was west of Skyline Drive, the scenic byway that runs through the park. Additionally, more than a dozen hiking trails were closed, including a section of the Appalachian Trail. By Wednesday April 20, more than 200 firefighters were on scene or en route, supported by two helicopters carrying water buckets and eight fire engines. The fire was only 1 percent contained and full containment was not anticipated until April 30 because of ongoing weather conditions favoring fire growth.
 
Skyline Drive road closure was extended further south to mile 87 on April 22. The fire was 60 percent contained and 356 firefighting and support personnel were assigned to the fire. The back-burn was created by dropping "ping pong balls" from a helicopter; these are spheres the size of a ping pong ball filled with a flammable substance that ignites as they impact the ground. On April 28, the fire was 90 percent contained and rainfall and fog made for difficult fireline work for the firefighters. However, the fire was deemed to be well within containment lines and a third of the firefighting personnel were demobilized. Mop up of firelines and rehabilitation of trails and natural resources was expected to continue until May 3. The final figure for acreage burned was determined to be ; the second largest forest fire in the history of Shenadoah National Park. On April 29, the fire was fully contained and while most of the hiking trails that had been closed to public access remained closed for a few more days, Skyline Drive was reopened to public vehicular traffic.

Smoke from the fire was reportedly visible in satellite imagery, drifting southeast and causing smoke haze over portions of central Virginia. The cause of the fire is unknown, but officials reported that it was likely human-caused. The fire's expansion was mainly caused by relatively hot and dry conditions compounded by low humidity levels and moderate to occasionally gusty winds. Smoke from the fire that was drifting to the southeast on April 19 shifted to the northwest on the 20th and again to the northeast on the 21st, spreading particulates into the air over Washington, D.C. The wind shift was due to an approaching weather front that brought only  of rain. To accommodate hikers attempting to use the Appalachian Trail, a shuttle service was set up to run every hour during normal business hours for the duration of the fire and trail closure. A no fly zone was also enacted, including prohibiting private drones from flying anywhere near the fire. The fire burned a region that had not previously experienced a fire since the creation of the park, so the area was full of dead and down wood, deep duff and overgrowth that was overdue for a large fire.

References 

2016 in Virginia
Shenandoah National Park